Medhat Moataz (born 23 October 2000) is an Egyptian fencer. He competed in the men's team sabre event at the 2020 Summer Olympics.

References

External links
 

2000 births
Living people
Egyptian male sabre fencers
Olympic fencers of Egypt
Fencers at the 2020 Summer Olympics
Place of birth missing (living people)
21st-century Egyptian people